Joseph Hurley (May 6, 1914 – October 5, 1982) was an American art director. He was nominated for an Academy Award in the category Best Art Direction for the film Psycho.

Selected filmography
 Psycho (1960)

References

External links

1914 births
1982 deaths
American art directors